Robert Howard Crabtree  (born 17 April 1948) is a British-American chemist. He is serving as Conkey P. Whitehead Professor Emeritus of Chemistry at Yale University in the United States. He is a naturalized citizen of the United States. Crabtree is particularly known for his work on "Crabtree's catalyst" for hydrogenations, and his textbook on organometallic chemistry.

Education
Robert Howard Crabtree studied at Brighton College (1959–1966), and earned a Bachelor of Arts degree from the University of Oxford where he was a student at New College, Oxford in 1970, studying under Malcolm Green. He received his PhD from the University of Sussex in 1973, supervised by Joseph Chatt.

Career and research
After his PhD, he was a postdoctoral researcher with Hugh Felkin at the Institut de Chimie des Substances Naturelles at Gif-sur-Yvette, near Paris. He was a postdoctoral fellow (1973–1975) and then attaché de recherche (1975–1977). At the end of that time he was chargé de recherche. In 1977 Crabtree took an assistant professorship in Inorganic Chemistry at Yale University. He served as associate professor from 1982 to 1985, and as full professor from 1985 to 2021. In retirement, he now serves as an emeritus professor of chemistry.

Editorial positions and published works
The Organometallic Chemistry of the Transition Metals (7 editions)
Inorganic Chemistry Section (editor) Encyclopedia of Inorganic Chemistry (1992–1994)
Associate Editor of New Journal of Chemistry (1998–2003)
Editor-in-chief of Comprehensive Organometallic Chemistry III (2004–present)
Editor-in-chief of Encyclopedia of Inorganic Chemistry (2004–present)
Board of regional editors of Science (2006–present)Chemistry of the Transition Metals (2009)Handbook of Green Chemistry – Green Catalysis (2009) (co-author)

Awards and honours

named Fellow of the Alfred P. Sloan Foundation (1981)
named Dreyfus Teacher-Scholar (1982)
received the Corday-Morgan Medal from the Royal Society of Chemistry (1982)
delivered the Esso Lectureship series (Toronto) (1986)
named Albright and Wilson Visiting Professor at University of Warwick (1986)
appointed to editorial board of Chemical Reviews (1990)
received the Organometallic Chemistry Prize from American Chemical Society (1991)
named Vice Chair of Organometallic Subdivision of ACS (1991)
named Chair of Organometallic Subdivision of ACS (1992)
received the Organometallic Chemistry Prize of ACS (1993)
received the Mack Award from Ohio State University (1994)
named H.C. Brown Lecturer at Purdue University (1996)
named Vice Chair of Inorganic Chemistry Division of ACS (1997)
named Chair of Inorganic Chemistry Division of ACS (1998)
named Dow Lecturer at University of Ottawa (1999)
received the ISI Highly Cited Author Award (2000)
received the Bailar Medal at University of Illinois (2001)
delivered Organometallic lecture at University of Richmond (2003)
named Dow Lecturer at University of California, Berkeley (2004)
delivered the Williams Lecture at University of Oxford (2004)
delivered the Sabatier Lecture at University of Toulouse (2006)
delivered the Brewster Lecture at Kansas State University (2006)
received the Karcher Medal at Oklahoma State University (2007)
delivered the Pedersen Lecture at DuPont (2008)
named John Osborn Lecturer at University of Strasbourg (2009)
named Mond Lecturer by the Royal Society of Chemistry (2009
received an ACS Green Chemistry Award'' (2009)
Member National Academy of Sciences (2017)
elected a Fellow of the Royal Society (FRS) in 2018

References

1948 births
Living people
People educated at Brighton College
Alumni of New College, Oxford
Alumni of the University of Sussex
21st-century American chemists
British chemists
British expatriates in the United States
Fellows of the American Academy of Arts and Sciences
Members of the United States National Academy of Sciences
Fellows of the Royal Society
Inorganic chemists
Yale University faculty